Maureen Ruth Furniss is a writer, animation historian, animation theorist, critic, professor, and president of the Society for Animation Studies. Furniss served as a professor at the California Institute of Arts, Savannah College of Art and Design, University of Southern California, and Chapman University.

Biography
Furniss attended San Diego State University, studied "Telecommunications and Film," received a bachelor's degree in 1983 and a master's degree in 1987. In 1994 she received a Doctor of Philosophy (Ph.D.) from University of Southern California in 1994 using the dissertation "Things of the Spirit: A Study of Abstract Film."

She is the founding editor of Animation Journal, a peer-reviewed scholarly journal about animation.

Furniss contributed to the Encarta article about Chuck Jones.

Works
Chuck Jones: Conversations - Contains many interviews related to Chuck Jones
Art in Motion: Animation Aesthetics<ref>"Art in Motion Animation Aesthetics," Indiana University Press</ref>
The Animation Bible: A Practical Guide to the Art of Animating from Flipbooks to Flash
Things of the Spirit: A Study of Abstract Animation

References

External links

 Art in Motion: Animation Aesthetics at Google Books
Furniss' Animation History Classes website
 Motion Capture
 The Collected Shorts of Jan Svankmajer, produced by Kimstim Films, DVD from Kino International, 2005
 Art in Motion: Animation Aesthetics book review by Giannalberto Bendazzi - Hosted on Animation World Network

Year of birth missing (living people)
Living people
American magazine editors
Historians of animation
San Diego State University alumni
USC School of Cinematic Arts alumni
Chapman University faculty
Animation educators
American women non-fiction writers
Women magazine editors
American women academics